Paavola is the 3rd district of the city of Lahti, in the region of Päijät-Häme, Finland. It borders the districts of Kiveriö in the north, Möysä in the east and Keski-Lahti in the west.

The population of the statistical district of Itäinen keskusta, which covers Paavola as well as small parts of Keski-Lahti and Möysä, was 3,959 in 2019.

References 

Districts of Lahti